The 2004 MTV Movie Awards were held June 5, 2004, and were hosted by Lindsay Lohan and featured performances by Beastie Boys, D12 and Yeah Yeah Yeahs.

Performers
 Beastie Boys — "Ch-Check It Out"
 Yeah Yeah Yeahs — "Maps"
 D12 — "My Band"

Presenters
 Tom Cruise and Jamie Foxx — presented Best Female Performance
 Vin Diesel and Thandie Newton — presented Best On-Screen Team
 Snoop Dogg and Paris Hilton — presented Best Kiss
 Kate Beckinsale and Mark Ruffalo— presented Best Villain
 Ashton Kutcher — introduced Beastie Boys
 The Rock and Jessica Biel — presented Best Action Sequence
 Jimmy Fallon and Queen Latifah — presented Best Dance Sequence
 Kate Hudson and Matthew Perry — presented Breakthrough Male
 Scarlett Johansson and Jake Gyllenhaal — introduced Yeah Yeah Yeahs
 Ice Cube and Eve — presented Best Fight
 Christina Aguilera and Sharon Stone — presented Breakthrough Female
 Halle Berry — presented Best Male Performance
 Shawn Wayans, Marlon Wayans, and Brittany Murphy — presented Best Comedic Performance
 Lindsay Lohan — introduced D12
 Kirsten Dunst,  Ellen DeGeneres, and Tobey Maguire — presented Best Movie

Awards

Best Movie
 The Lord of the Rings: The Return of the King
 Finding Nemo
 50 First Dates
 Pirates of the Caribbean: The Curse of the Black Pearl
 X2: X-Men United

Best Male Performance
 Johnny Depp – Pirates of the Caribbean: The Curse of the Black Pearl
 Jim Caviezel – The Passion of the Christ
 Tom Cruise – The Last Samurai
 Bill Murray – Lost in Translation
 Adam Sandler – 50 First Dates

Best Female Performance
 Uma Thurman – Kill Bill: Volume 1
 Drew Barrymore – 50 First Dates
 Halle Berry – Gothika
 Queen Latifah – Bringing Down the House
 Charlize Theron – Monster

Breakthrough Male
 Shawn Ashmore – X2
 Shia LaBeouf – Holes
 Ludacris – 2 Fast 2 Furious
 Omarion – You Got Served
 Cillian Murphy – 28 Days Later

Breakthrough Female
 Lindsay Lohan – Freaky Friday
 Jessica Biel – The Texas Chainsaw Massacre
 Scarlett Johansson – Lost in Translation
 Keira Knightley – Pirates of the Caribbean: The Curse of the Black Pearl
 Evan Rachel Wood – Thirteen

Best On-Screen Team
 Adam Sandler and Drew Barrymore – 50 First Dates Johnny Depp and Orlando Bloom – Pirates of the Caribbean: The Curse of the Black Pearl
 Jack Black and the School of Rock Band (Aleisha Allen, Caitlin Hale, Joey Gaydos Jr, Kevin Clark, Maryam Hassan, Rebecca Brown, and Robert Tsai) – School of Rock
 Ben Stiller and Owen Wilson – Starsky & Hutch
 Will Smith and Martin Lawrence – Bad Boys II

Best Villain
 Lucy Liu – Kill Bill: Volume 1 Andrew Bryniarski – The Texas Chainsaw Massacre
 Demi Moore – Charlie's Angels: Full Throttle
 Geoffrey Rush – Pirates of the Caribbean: The Curse of the Black Pearl
 Kiefer Sutherland – Phone Booth

Best Comedic Performance
 Jack Black – School of Rock Jim Carrey – Bruce Almighty
 Ellen DeGeneres – Finding Nemo
 Johnny Depp – Pirates of the Caribbean: The Curse of the Black Pearl
 Will Ferrell – Elf

Best Kiss
 Owen Wilson, Carmen Electra and Amy Smart – Starsky & Hutch Charlize Theron and Christina Ricci – Monster
 Keanu Reeves and Monica Bellucci – The Matrix Reloaded
 Jim Carrey and Jennifer Aniston – Bruce Almighty
 Shawn Ashmore and Anna Paquin – X2

Best Action Sequence 
 Battle at Gondor – The Lord of the Rings: The Return of the King Intercoastal Freeway Pursuit – Bad Boys II
 Champion Crane Chase – Terminator 3: Rise of the Machines
 Escape from Mongolia – Charlie's Angels: Full Throttle

Best Dance Sequence
 Seann William Scott — "Maniac / Heaven Is a Place on Earth / Sweet Dreams (Are Made of This) / Venus / The Reflex" (from American Wedding) Drew Barrymore, Cameron Diaz, and Lucy Liu — "The Pink Panther Theme" (from Charlie's Angels: Full Throttle)
 Ben Stiller and Jennifer Aniston — "A Gozar Tambino" (from Along Came Polly)
 Steve Martin — "Let Go (Hit the Dancefloor)" (from Bringing Down the House)
 Omarion, Marques Houston, and the Lil' Saint's Dance Crew — "Find Out" (from You Got Served)

Best Fight
 Uma Thurman vs. Chiaki Kuriyama – Kill Bill: Volume 1 Hugh Jackman vs. Kelly Hu – X2
 Keanu Reeves vs. Hugo Weaving – The Matrix Reloaded
 The Rock vs. Kontiki Rebels – The Rundown
 Queen Latifah vs. Missi Pyle – Bringing Down the House

Best Cameo
 Simon Cowell – Scary Movie 3' Matt Damon – EuroTrip Paul Michael Glaser and David Soul – Starsky & Hutch John McEnroe – Anger Management Pink – Charlie's Angels: Full Throttle''

References

External links 
 2004 MTV Movie Awards on imdb 

 2004
Mtv Movie Awards
MTV Movie Awards
2004 in Los Angeles
2004 in American cinema